Orbeli generally refers to:

 House of Orbeli, the powerful family in the 12th and 13th century Georgia
 Orbeli family, is an Armenian family
 House of Orbeliani, Georgian noble family (tavadi)
 Orbelian Dynasty, a medieval Armenian noble family and lords of the province of Syunik
 Joseph Orbeli, an Armenian orientalist
 Leon Orbeli, an Armenian physiologist

See also 
 Liparitids, a medieval Georgian noble family